Leivasy is an unincorporated community in Nicholas County, West Virginia, United States. Leivasy is located on West Virginia Route 20,  of Richwood. Leivasy has a post office with ZIP code 26676.

Vol Leivasy, an early postmaster, gave the community his name.

References

Unincorporated communities in Nicholas County, West Virginia
Unincorporated communities in West Virginia